The 2019 REV Group Grand Prix at Road America was an IndyCar Series event held at Road America in Elkhart Lake, Wisconsin. The race served as the 10th round of the 2019 IndyCar Series season. Colton Herta became the youngest ever driver to win an IndyCar pole. Alexander Rossi took the lead in the first two corners and proceeded to dominate the race, leading all but one lap and winning by over 28 seconds in the caution-free race. It was Rossi's last win until the 2022 Gallagher Grand Prix

Results

Qualifying

Race 

Notes:
 Points include 1 point for leading at least 1 lap during a race, an additional 2 points for leading the most race laps, and 1 point for Pole Position.

Championship standings after the race 

Drivers' Championship standings

Manufacturer standings

 Note: Only the top five positions are included.

References 

REV Group Grand Prix at Road America
REV Group Grand Prix at Road America
2019 REV Group Grand Prix at Road America
REV Group Grand Prix at Road America